The Egyptian Geographic Society was established by a decree of Khedive Ismail Pasha on 19 May 1875. Its first president was the German botanist, traveller and ethnologist Georg August Schweinfurth. Founded as the Khedivial Society of Geography, its name was modified several times in order to reflect Egypt's changing political status. It acquired its current name following the Egyptian Revolution of 1952.

References

External links
Official Website

1875 establishments in Egypt
Geographic societies
Society
Geographic Society
Organizations established in 1875